Saint Scholastica's College, also referred to by its acronym SSC or colloquially St. Scho is a private Catholic basic and higher education institution for women founded and managed by the Congregation of the Missionary Benedictine Sisters of Tutzing in a  lot in Malate, Manila. It was established in 1906 initially offering elementary academic programs. It started admitting high school students in 1907 and opened its collegiate department in 1920. It pioneered in formal music education in the Philippines, opening a Conservatory of Music in 1907. 

Although Saint Scholastica's College is an exclusive school for women, admission of male students in the Music, Fine Arts, Interior Design, and preschool programs has been allowed. The college is recognized by the Department of Education and the Commission on Higher Education and also a charter member of the Philippine Accrediting Association of Schools, Colleges and Universities. It has earned Level III accreditation on all of its respective departments and schools. The college had its centennial celebration on December 3, 2006, at the Quirino Grandstand in Rizal Park, Ermita, Manila.

History

The college was founded by five young German sisters: Mother M. Ferdinanda Hoelzer, OSB, Sr. Petronilla Keller, OSB, Sr. Cresentia Veser, OSB, Sr. Winfrieda Mueller, OSB, and Novice Alexia Ruedenauer on December 3, 1906 at the request of Apostolic Delegate Monsignor Dom Ambrose Agius, O.S.B. and Archbishop of Manila Jeremiah James Harty, D.D. to give religious education to the children of Manila. The site of the college was then a small residential house surrounded by fishermen's huts in the fishing village of Tondo. There were then six paying students and 50 non-paying students or scholars.

A year after the college opened, it moved to a property in San Marcelino Street in Manila which was later occupied by St. Theresa's College (Manila) and where Adamson University now stands. The school was then housed in an old military barracks. 

On December 14, 1914, the college was moved again to another site in Singalong Street where the college presently stands. The latest campus is bounded by Estrada Street on the north, P. Ocampo Street on the south, Singalong Street on the east and Leon Guinto Street on the west. 

The college was ravaged by World War II where its school buildings were all destroyed. Reconstruction of the buildings began in 1946 and took nine years to restore.

Academics

Academic linkages

The college is a member of the South Manila Inter-Constitutional Schools along with De La Salle University, Philippine Women's University, Philippine Christian University, Adamson University, Philippine Normal University, and the St. Paul University Manila. The students of the member schools may take accredited subjects in their chosen school for cross-enrollment. The college is also part of the Women's Consortium Colleges which includes Miriam College in Katipunan, Assumption College San Lorenzo in Makati, La Consolacion College Manila in Mendiola, St. Paul University Quezon City, and the College of the Holy Spirit Manila in Mendiola.

Notable alumnae and students
Corazon Cojuangco-Aquino - President of the Philippines (1986-1992); mother of President Benigno S. Aquino III and widow of Sen. Benigno S. Aquino Jr.
Sister Agnes Awuor - Kenyan nun, politician
Risa Hontiveros-Baraquel - Senator
Alisah Bonaobra - Singer
Fille Cainglet-Cayetano - Former player of Ateneo de Manila University's varsity volleyball team the Lady Blue Eagles
Dzi Gervacio - Former player of Ateneo de Manila University's varsity volleyball team the Lady Blue Eagles
Mika Reyes - Former player of De la Salle University's varsity volleyball team the Lady Spikers. 
Aia de Leon - vocalist, Imago
Andrea del Rosario - actress
Gloria Maria Aspillera Diaz - Miss Universe (1969), later became an actress and television personality
Pia Guanio - TV host
Barbie Almalbis-Honasan - Singer
Toni Leviste - equestrian
Maria Clara Lorenzo-Lobregat - former Mayor and Congresswoman of Zamboanga City
Kitchie Nadal - Singer, composer
Cecilia Muñoz-Palma - first woman Supreme Court Justice of the Philippines
Tina Monzon Palma - Program Director, ABS-CBN Bantay Bata 163; Newscaster, ABS-CBN
Aurora Pijuan - Miss International 1970
Mikee Quintos - actress, singer
Maria Ressa (til third grade) - CEO & Executive Editor, Rappler; Former ABS-CBN News and Current Affairs Dept head; Former Jakarta bureau chief, Nobel laureate, CNN International
Josephine Cojuangco-Reyes - President, Far Eastern University (1985-1989), Vice President - Hacienda Luisita
Dulce Saguisag - politician, former Secretary of Department of Social Welfare and Development
Mercedes Arrastia Tuason - Diplomatic Ambassador to the Holy See, Vatican.
Nancy Binay - Senator
Abigail Binay - Mayor of Makati
Patricia Lasaten - Keyboardist, Ben&Ben
Agnes Reoma - Bassist, Ben&Ben
Bong Coo - Athlete; Philippines' first athlete recognized by the Guinness World Records.
Amalia Fuentes - actress, businesswoman

Buildings
 Saint Cecilia's Hall
 St. Hildegarde Building
 St. Joseph Hall

See also
St. Scholastica's Academy Marikina, Metro Manila

References

External links
Official website

Education in Malate, Manila
Catholic universities and colleges in Manila
Catholic elementary schools in Manila
Catholic secondary schools in Manila
Girls' schools in the Philippines
Women's universities and colleges in the Philippines
Universities and colleges in Manila
Liberal arts colleges in the Philippines
Educational institutions established in 1906
Benedictine colleges and universities
1906 establishments in the Philippines